Miodrag Džudović (born 6 September 1979) is a Montenegrin football manager and former player who played as a defender. He is manager of Budućnost Podgorica.

After retiring in 2014, he went into coaching. He worked as an assistant of the Montenegro national team, caretaker manager of Budućnost Podgorica in 2018, and as a caretaker manager of the Montenegro national team in 2019. In August 2022. he become manager of Budućnost Podgorica.

Playing career

Club career
Džudović began his football career in 1999 by joining his first club, Jezero Plav which is a Montenegrin club. They rose to third level in 2001, and a year later and the Second League of FR Yugoslavia. In 2003, Džudović joined another Montenegrin club FK Jedinstvo Bijelo Polje but just making 14 appearances and scoring 2, he left to join Serbian club OFK Beograd in First League of FR Yugoslavia, but made only one appearance and helped the club qualify for the Intertoto Cup, the first time the club qualified for a European Cup in 30 years.

In 2004, Džudović left OFK Beograd to join a Ukrainian side Volyn Lutsk and signing a three-year contract with the team. Džudović made his debut in the Ukrainian Premier League was held 27 March 2004 in a victory for the "Volyn" match against Karpaty Lviv. In Spring 2005 in a match against Dynamo Kyiv, Džudović received a serious injury that gave rise to early termination of the contract. In less than three seasons in the "Volyn" Miodrag spent 44 games in which scoring one goal.

In 2006, Džudović joined a Russian club Spartak Nalchik, signing a contract with a local club. Miodrag debut in the Russian Premier League took place on 18 March 2006 in the first round match against the CSKA Moscow which they lost 1–0. On 26 March 2006, Džudović scored his first goal for the club and scored in the Premier League against Spartak Moscow in a 2–2 draw. He is Spartak's captain as of 2007. In Opening match of league 2010, Džudović made his 100th appearance for the club against Anzhi Makhachkala which had Džudović t-shirt on the back.

In November 2014, Džudović left FC Irtysh Pavlodar after one season with them.

International career
His good performance in Russia led Montenegro manager Zoran Filipović called up Džudović into the squad. He scored his first goal for national team on his debut against Macedonia on 19 November 2008 and played 90 minutes in the game.

Džudović made headlines when Wayne Rooney kicked him during a Euro 2012 qualifier that resulted in a three-game ban (the entire group stage of Euro 2012) for the Manchester United and England national team striker.  At first, it was known that Rooney would miss at least one match in the opening round of the first phase at UEFA Euro 2012. After the game with Montenegro, Rooney sent a personal letter to UEFA in which he apologised and expressed regret for the tackle on Džudović which earned him the red card. Džudović also wrote to UEFA and pleaded for Rooney's ban to be reduced.

He earned a total of 26 caps, scoring one goal and his final international was a September 2013 FIFA World Cup qualification match away against Poland.

Personal life
Džudović is married and has three children. One son is called Branko (who was born on 2 January 2010) and his daughter's name is Tatjana.

References

External links

 
 
 

1979 births
Living people
People from Plav, Montenegro
Association football central defenders
Serbia and Montenegro footballers
Montenegrin footballers
Montenegro international footballers
FK Jezero players
FK Jedinstvo Bijelo Polje players
OFK Beograd players
FC Volyn Lutsk players
PFC Spartak Nalchik players
FC Irtysh Pavlodar players
Second League of Serbia and Montenegro players
First League of Serbia and Montenegro players
Ukrainian Premier League players
Russian Premier League players
Russian First League players
Kazakhstan Premier League players
Serbia and Montenegro expatriate footballers
Expatriate footballers in Ukraine
Serbia and Montenegro expatriate sportspeople in Ukraine
Montenegrin expatriate footballers
Expatriate footballers in Russia
Montenegrin expatriate sportspeople in Russia
Expatriate footballers in Kazakhstan
Montenegrin expatriate sportspeople in Kazakhstan
Montenegrin football managers
Montenegro national football team managers
FK Budućnost Podgorica managers